Fortes is a family name in mostly Portuguese-speaking countries.

Famous people named Fortes include:
Agostinho Fortes Filho (1901–1966), known as Fortes, Brazilian international footballer.
Alberto Fortes (born 1958), Spanish-German author and chef.
Alvin Fortes (born 1994), Dutch footballer.
Amâncio José Pinto Fortes (born 1990), Angolan football midfielder .
Carlos Fortes (footballer, born 1974), Dutch footballer.
Carlos Manuel Santos Fortes (born 1994), Portuguese footballer.
Corsino Fortes (born 1933), Cape Verdean poet.
Eddy Fortes (born 1950), Rotterdam-based Cape-Verdean rapper.
Emanuel Fortes (born 1970), Brazilian former international freestyle swimmer.
Enrique Fortes (born 1947), Cuban volleyball player.
Fábio Fortes (born 1992), Portuguese footballer.
Felisberto Fortes (1927–2013), Portuguese rower.
Filipe Fortes, Brazilian Businessman and Investor.
Hermínia da Cruz Fortes (1941—2010), Cape Verdean singer.
Jeffrey Fortes (born 1989), Dutch-Cape Verdean footballer.
Jesús Fortes Socas (born 1997), Spanish footballer .
Joe Fortes (1863–1922), Canadian lifeguard.
José Fortes Rodríguez (born 1972), Spanish professional footballer.
Nicholas Fortes (1989) Musician.
Nick Fortes (born 1996), American baseball player
Marco Fortes (born 1982), Portuguese shot putter.
Meyer Fortes (1906–1983), South African-born anthropologist.
Odaïr Fortes (born 1987), Cape Verdean footballer.
Paco Fortes (born 1955), Spanish footballer and manager.
Paula Fortes (1945–2011), Cape Verdean independence activist.
Roberto Fortes (born 1984), Angolan basketball player.
Steven Fortès (born 1992), French professional footballer.
Susana Fortes (born 1959), Spanish writer and columnist.

See also
Fort
Forte (disambiguation)